The Satellite Award for Best Supporting Actress in a Television Series Drama and Musical/Comedy was an award given in 2002 and 2003.

Winners and nominees

2000s

Drama

Musical or Comedy

Actress - Television Series, Supporting
Television awards for Best Supporting Actress

fr:Satellite Award - Anciennes récompenses - Télévision